Chicagoland is a documentary series that debuted its pilot episode at the 2014 Sundance Film Festival on January 19, 2014. It was aired on CNN in eight successive weekly broadcasts beginning March 6, 2014, and ending April 24, 2014. It is executive produced by Robert Redford and Laura Michalchyshyn and created by Mark Benjamin and Marc Levin.  During its production, the documentary received assistance from the office of Chicago mayor Rahm Emanuel.

Background
Chicagoland is part of a CNN strategy, directed by network President Jeff Zucker, to make CNN's programming less dependent on the unpredictable ebbs and flows of the 24-hour news cycle. Zucker decided to introduce documentary series in its program line-up in order to attract viewers during periods when the news is insufficient to compel viewer attention. 

The show was executively produced by Redford and created by filmmakers Benjamin and Levin, who had previously created the very similarly themed show Brick City, a documentary about Newark, New Jersey. Chicagoland is narrated by Mark Konkol. The filming took eight months in 2013. CNN described the show as: "The riveting, real-life drama of a city looking to unite at this critical moment in the city’s history."

Production
The show was filmed by three camera crews that amassed over 1000 hours of footage. Three of the principal subjects of the crews were Mayor Rahm Emanuel, South Side high school principal Elizabeth Dozier and Chicago Police Department superintendent Garry McCarthy. The Chicago Tribune gained access to over 700 e-mails between Emanuel, Benjamin, Levin, and CNN.  In response to the Chicago Tribune report, CNN asserted that the Mayor's office had neither editorial control nor editorial approval over either the show's content or its associated promotional material, and one of the Chicago Tribune reporters said the emails show the normal scheduling and schmoozing involved in working with subjects. The Huffington Post blogger Spencer Green mocked the whole ordeal saying that a sequel was forthcoming entitled Rahm Emanuel: A Towering God Among Men. Months before the show ever aired, Levin and Benjamin, who were clients of The William Morris Endeavor (WME) agency requested that WME not represent them in this production to avoid a conflict of interest because WME's co-CEO is Ari Emanuel, brother of Rahm.

Episodes

Reception
Alessandra Stanley of The New York Times says the show is a "commendable" effort with "compelling characters" and described its subject matter and cinematic depiction favorably. Allison Keene of The Hollywood Reporter said noted both positive and negative elements of the show, but generally approved of its overall presentation. Keene also noted, however, that subsequent episodes did not quite live up to the premiere. Los Angeles Times critic Robert Lloyd stated Mayor Emanuel's energy is entertaining and he is quite charming before the right audience, and that high school principal Dozier is compelling and full of life. Brian Lowry of Variety questioned the worth of the show as a constructive use of time for viewers. According to Crain's ChicagoBusiness, the show is "often disturbing" yet "hope-inspiring". The Wrap's Tim Molloy said that Chicagoland was good, but did not compare to Brick City. Among the few reviews that were published after or near the end of the series was a negative one by Rick Kogan of the Chicago Tribune. Kogan considered the whole series a bit "contrived". During the 8-week span the viewership dropped off precipitously losing 48% of its viewers.

Notes

External links
Chicagoland Website

 Chicagoland at Thefutoncritic.com
 

2010s American documentary television series
2014 American television series debuts
2014 American television series endings
Mass media in Chicago
CNN original programming
Chicago television shows
2013 in Illinois
Works about Chicago